Halstead Place was a historic residence located at East Brach Drive in Ocean Springs, Mississippi. Constructed in 1910, it was on the National Register of Historic Places until 2008. It was destroyed by Hurricane Katrina in 2005.

References

Houses on the National Register of Historic Places in Mississippi
Former National Register of Historic Places in Mississippi
Houses in Jackson County, Mississippi
National Register of Historic Places in Jackson County, Mississippi